The University of Nebraska Curling Club is the collegiate curling team that represents the University of Nebraska-Lincoln. They are an officially recognized organization on the campus in Lincoln, and are affiliated with the Aksarben Curling Association. Their home arena is Baxter Arena in Omaha, Nebraska. The team, founded in late 2007, practices at the Breslow Ice Hockey Center near main campus. They are coached by Nancy Myers and led by president Olivia Schuster and vice president Seamus Hurley.

History

Club formation and growth (2007–2012)
The Nebraska Curling Club began its history as the University of Nebraska Curling Guild in 2007. Prior to being an official registered student organization (RSO) at the University of Nebraska-Lincoln, a group of friends, who all attended UNL, participated in an Aksarben Curling Club open house in October 2007 in Omaha, Nebraska. Matt Gibney, one of the team's founding fathers, said, "I saw it in the 2006 Olympics and I thought I kind of want to try this out so a couple of us came up here, tried it out a few times and then once on the way home we said this is a lot of fun, we want to keep doing this."

Erik Mellgren, another founding father who had prior experience setting up a RSO as a part of the UNL Lumberjack Club, suggested that the group pursue making a recognized curling organization through the university to obtain additional funding. Before long they were an RSO as a club sport through the university's recreational center. The team would travel to Omaha to compete in the Aksarben Curling Club's weekly league on Sundays between October and March. The team was forced to travel due to the lack of available ice and competition in Lincoln.

The team officially began competition in January 2008, joining the Aksarben Curling Club League at mid-season. The team consisting of Joel Schulte, Jason Grant, Erik Mellgren, and Matt Gibney went on to finish league play at 3–3. The Aksarben Curling Club provided a scholarship to the team to compete in the club's end of season bonspiel, the Irish Open. Nebraska wound up going winless in the bonspiel.

After league play had wrapped up, the team traveled to Chicago to compete in the annual College Curling Championship against 32 other colleges and universities. Nebraska, who many considered an underdog going into the championship tournament, earned the bronze after going 4–1 and beating Michigan Tech in the bronze medal match.

The 2008–2009 season marked the first full season for the Nebraska Curling team. With all of the members of the bronze medal team returning, expectations were high. They participated in the Aksarben Curling Club's league and finished in the middle of the pack. The team also entered the College Curling Championship bonspiel, again hosted in Chicago. The team finished a disappointing 0–3.

The club saw its first real increase in members during the 2009–2010 season. Nebraska fielded two teams in both the Aksarben Curling Club league play and in the College Curling Championships.

With all of the founding team members having graduated, the 2010–2011 team came into the season relatively untested. The inexperience showed, with both teams posting the worst Aksarben Curling Club league play record in UNL Curling Club history finishing the season with a combined 3–23 record. Despite the poor league play showing, Nebraska entered two teams to compete in the National Championships in Chicago, IL. The two teams continued to struggle in the event posting a combined 1–5 record, with the lone win coming against Washington University in St. Louis.

Again two teams competed for the Huskers in the Aksarben Curling Club League during the 2011–2012 season. They showed significant improvement over the past year and looked ready to make some noise on the national stage. Additionally, the Huskers sent one team to compete in the Rice Lake Bonspiel. This marked the first time in club history the team competed in an intercollegiate bonspiel outside of the national championship.

The 2011–2012 season was a transition year for college curling. The national championship event that had been hosted in Chicago in previous years was not scheduled to take place and the USA Curling College Championship was in its early stages and had yet to establish a national championship event. Instead Regional Championships where hosted. Schools could sign up to participate in the events. The Nebraska Curling Club chose to participate in the Midwest Regional Championship hosted at the Kettle Moraine Curling Club in Hartland, Wisconsin. They went on to win the Division III silver medal.

USA Curling College Championship Era (2012–present)

In 2012, the USA Curling College Championship was created and established a true national championship event for collegiate curling. The event also eliminated the divisional tiers based on experience, leaving all team to compete against each other. The support of USA Curling gave the USA Curling College Championship credibility and helped to promote the growth of college curling through the United States. Under the guidelines and requirements of the USA Curling College Championship, teams earn a birth to the championship event by accumulating merit points during the curling season. Schools with the highest number of merit points receive an invitation to compete for the national championship: the five regional winners and eleven at large bids.

Nebraska was placed in Region 5. Region 5 is currently considered an emerging region by the USA Curling College Championship due to the lack of relative competition in the area and mostly consists of school located outside of the northeast; This allows for merit points to be earned by competing in community leagues and non-college specific bonspiels.

In addition to competing in league play with the Aksarben Curling Club in Omaha, NE during the 2012–2013 season, the UNL Curling Club added several collegiate bonspiels to their schedule to help earn merit points towards the USA Curling College Championship. Bonspiels included the Tennessee College Bonspiel, the Rice Lake College Bonspiel, Carroll College Bonspiel, and the Jonniespiel. Based on merit points accumulated, they finished the 2012–2013 season tied for 5th in the nation and runner-up to Tennessee in Region 5, earning a berth to nationals hosted in Duluth, MN. The team went 0–3 and was swept during the round robin portion of the event, eliminating them from contention. The University of Minnesota went on to win the 2013 USA Curling College Championship.

The 2013–2014 season saw a change in leadership, with Cameron Binder taking the role of club president (formerly Viceroy). With new leadership and a solid recruiting class, Nebraska competed in league play with the Aksarben Curling Club in Omaha, NE and several collegiate bonspiels. Thanks to the 2014 Winter Olympic Games Nebraska saw a growth in the amount of media attention they received. At the end of the season, they finished 10th in the nation and once again runner-up to Tennessee in Region 5. Nebraska received a berth to nationals hosted in Blaine, MN. Nebraska finished 2–1 in round robin, but lost the warm draw tie breaker to Carroll University. The University of Wisconsin - Green Bay went on to win the 2014 USA Curling College Championship.

During the 2014 off season, significant changes were made to the clubs constitution to reflect a more traditional organization. Among the changes where the renaming of organizational positions, newly introduced positions, and an organizational name change; the curling team would now be the University of Nebraska Curling Club (UNCC) instead of the University of Nebraska Curling Guild (UNCG).

With recent national success and media coverage, the University of Nebraska Curling Club saw a large growth of interest in the team in 2014. This resulted in the club expanding its roster to accommodate a third team in the Aksarben Curling Club's league, which had moved from the Tranquility Iceplex to the Ralston Arena.

To start the 2014–2015 season, they sent two teams to compete in the Butler Bulldog Bonspiel; both teams played well winning both champion and runner-up of the event. They also sent teams to the Rice Lake College Bonspiel and the Carroll College Bonspiel. In February, Nebraska hosted and won the Big Red Bonspiel at the Ralston Arena in Omaha; this marked the first time that the Nebraska Curling club had ever hosted its own college bonspiel. During the 2014–2015 season, Nebraska earned its highest ranking in club history by holding the number one ranking multiple times throughout the season.

Rivalries
University of Tennessee

Historically, the Nebraska-Tennessee rivalry has carried regional championship and national championship implications. In 2014, it was announced that a traveling rivalry trophy would be established and exchanged each time the two teams competed head-to-head. The trophy to be exchanged will be called The Tennebraska Cup. This would be College Curling's first rivalry trophy. The trophy will represent the pride and history of two strong programs in areas where curling is still emerging.

Wayne State College

With the formation of the Wayne State Curling Club in 2014, the in-state rivalry was born. Both the UNL Curling Club and the WSC Curling Club had one twin, and so the rivalry was based on beef from birth but has since evolved into not-nice strife on the ice. Since 2014 the UNL Curling team has attempted to keep up with WSC in national rankings, to little success.

Results by season

* Indicated that two UNL teams competed in the event.
** Indicates that three UNL teams competed in the event.
Bold Indicates weekly league competed in.

Roster
All-time roster

See also
Curling
Nebraska Cornhuskers
Sports in Omaha

Notes

External links
UNL Curling Homepage
USA College Curling Championship
Aksarben Curling Association

In the news
A (b)room of their own – Omaha World Herald Article
Throw the Stones – Hail Varsity Article

References

Curl
Sports in Omaha, Nebraska
College curling in the United States
Curling in Nebraska
2007 establishments in Nebraska
Curling clubs established in 2007